A dual-mode bus is a bus that can run independently on power from two different sources, typically electricity from overhead lines like a trolleybus or from batteries like a hybrid bus, alternated with conventional fossil fuel (generally diesel fuel). In contrast to other hybrid buses, dual-mode buses can run forever exclusively on their electric power source (wires). Several of the examples listed below involve the use of dual-mode buses to travel through a tunnel on electric overhead power.

Many modern trolleybuses are equipped with auxiliary propulsion systems, either using a small diesel engine or battery power, allowing movement away from the overhead wires, called "off-wire" movement, but such vehicles are generally not considered to be dual-mode buses if their off-wire capability is very limited.  Examples include the fleet of about 300 trolleybuses in San Francisco and the trolleybuses used on a 2005-opened system in Rome, Italy, which are capable of running on battery power only for short distances or short periods of time before needing recharging. The Rome vehicles are powered from overhead trolley wires over most of the 11.5-km route and only use battery power on the 500-metre section closest to the city centre. Dual mode trolleybuses in a number of Chinese cities can operate significant distances (8 to 10 km) off-wire on battery power.

Examples

 Beijing, China uses a fleet of over 1,250 dual-mode trolleybuses for its trolleybus network.
 Bergen, Norway features dual-mode MAN-Neoplan buses in the Bergen trolleybus system
 Boston, Massachusetts, USA installed dual-mode Neoplan DMA-460LF buses on the Waterfront portion of its Silver Line in 2005.  Electric power is required in the exclusive right of way that runs in a tunnel under Fort Point Channel to South Station; diesel power is used to run on city streets and highways, including the Ted Williams Tunnel to Logan Airport
 Castellón de la Plana, Spain installed a new trolleybus line that went into operation 25 June 2008.  The Irisbus Civis vehicles are optically guided and are capable of switching to diesel engine power for turning in front of the Parque Ribalta.
 Seattle, Washington, USA used 236 dual-mode Breda ETB buses in its downtown bus tunnel from 1990 until late 2004, when the fleet of dual-mode buses were retired, except for 59 converted to electric-only service and were replaced in the tunnel by hybrid diesel-electric buses.
Shanghai, China uses a fleet of over 300 dual-mode trolleybuses for its network.
 Ploiești, Romania features ex-Lausanne Neoplan N6121 dual-mode buses in the Ploiești trolleybus system.
 São Paulo, Brazil also has a dual bus that operates in the Jabaquara district, in the south zone. One of these is a Superarticulated Bus that operates in the Corredor ABD.
 Gdynia and Lublin, both Poland have the dual-mode buses running as part of their trolleybus networks, in case of Gdynia, their (PKT's) duobuses are Solaris Trollinos and Mercedes Citaros (which were converted into trolleybuses in 2012). Both of these types, unlike typical dual-mode buses, are trolleybus and electric bus hybrids.

See also

 Diesel-electric transmission
 Dual-mode vehicle
 Electric bus
 Electric vehicle battery
 Electro-diesel locomotive, locomotive equivalent.
 Guided bus
 List of buses

References

External links

Buses by type

ja:バス (交通機関)#その他の特殊なバス